The House That Jack Built is a 2012 album by Jesca Hoop, released through Bella Union, and recorded in Los Angeles. An announcement was released on March 19, 2012, containing samples of the songs and clips of the videos, narrated by a stop-motion marionette skeleton 'Sketch', claiming to be the skeleton of Jesca Hoop.

Track listing
 "Born To" - 3:44
 "Pack Animal" - 2:37
 "Peacemaker" - 4:43
 "Hospital (Win Your Love)" - 3:48
 "The House That Jack Built" - 4:12
 "Ode To Banksy" - 4:06
 "Dig This Record" - 4:01
 "D.N.R." - 4:16	
 "Deeper Devastation" - 4:46
 "When I'm Asleep" - 3:21

Bonus track (available online with album purchase)
 "Moon Rock Needle" - 3:16

References

External links

2012 albums
Jesca Hoop albums
Bella Union albums